The 2015 Supercopa MX was a Mexican football match-up which was played on July 20, 2015 between the champions of the Apertura 2014 Copa MX, Monarcas Morelia, and the winner of the Clausura 2015 Copa MX, Puebla. Unlike the 2014 edition, which was played over two-legs hosted by each participating team, the 2015 Supercopa MX was a one match at a neutral venue, Toyota Stadium in Frisco, Texas, United States.

The winner of Supercopa MX typically earns a spot in the Copa Libertadores first stage as "Mexico 3". However, Santos Laguna who won the Apertura 2014 Copa MX qualified to the 2015–16 CONCACAF Champions League after winning the Clausura 2015 league title and are therefore ineligible for South American competitions. Which meant Puebla automatically earned a spot in the 2016 Copa Libertadores first stage. Winning the Clausura 2015 league title also meant Santos Laguna played the 2015 Campeón de Campeones against the winner of the Apertura 2014 league title Club América later that night. Therefore, Santos Laguna was replaced by Monarcas Morelia, the winners of the Apertura 2013 Copa MX and the 2014 Supercopa MX.

The 2015 Supercopa MX was part of a doubleheader, which also includes the 2015 Campeón de Campeones, organized by Univision Deportes, Soccer United Marketing (SUM), FC Dallas and Liga MX.

Match details

See also
Apertura 2014 Copa MX
Clausura 2015 Copa MX

References

2015
2015–16 in Mexican football
Atlético Morelia matches
Club Puebla matches